The Dos Cabezas Mountains are a mountain range in southeasternmost Arizona, United States. The mountain range's name means Two Heads in Spanish, for the twin granite peaks, Dos Cabezas Peaks, that sit atop the range.

Geology

There is a diverse terrain of steep mountain slopes, granite outcroppings and vegetated canyon floors. The higher mountains and ridges offer long-distance views of Sulphur Springs and San Simon Valleys and numerous mountain ranges.

Wildlife
Several developed and natural springs in the wilderness provide water for the abundant wildlife.  White-tailed and mule deer, mountain lions, golden eagles, bald eagles and many other animals inhabit the Dos Cabezas Mountains. The collared lizard may be found in the upper portions of Buckeye Canyon. The peregrine falcon migrates through the area. The peregrine was delisted from endangered status in 1999. The majority of the wilderness contains mountain shrub, desert shrub and riparian vegetation. , the Arizona Game and Fish Department has been releasing photos of a jaguar that has been seen in this area since November 2016 with 45 documented events. This is the second known jaguar living in the state.

See also 
 Chiricahua Mountains – connected at southeast

References

External links 

 
 Bureau of Land Management
 Dos Cabezas Peaks, at Summitpost
 Dos Cabezas & Chiricahua Mtns, west of San Simon Valley;  (Article)

Mountain ranges of Cochise County, Arizona
Madrean Sky Islands mountain ranges
Mountain ranges of Arizona